Asyik FM, formerly known as Radio 7 Aslian language service, is an Orang Asli radio station operated by Malaysian state broadcaster Radio Televisyen Malaysia (RTM). It broadcasts from 8:00am to 11:00pm (local time). It is shared with Salam FM (Jakim Radio), an Islamic radio station operated by Department of Islamic Development Malaysia (JAKIM) with cooperation from RTM for the remaining timeslot from 11:00pm to 8:00am (local time).

Etymology 
The station was formerly known as Radio 7 and Radio Malaysia Channel 7.

Frequency

Radio

Television

References

External links 
 

1959 establishments in Malaya
Radio stations in Malaysia
Malay-language radio stations
Radio Televisyen Malaysia